Gerald Lee Staley (August 21, 1920 – January 2, 2008) was an American right-handed pitcher in Major League Baseball. He was drafted by the St. Louis Cardinals in the 1942 Minor League draft. He pitched regularly from 1947 on, then was traded to Cincinnati for the 1955 season. In 1955 and 1956, he pitched for three teams, including the Yankees, before ending up with the Chicago White Sox, whom he helped to the  American League pennant as a reliever.

He finished 28th in voting for the AL's 1959 Most Valuable Player Award after leading the league in games with 67 and games finished with 37, and had an 8–5 record, 14 saves in  innings, 54 strikeouts, and a 2.24 earned run average.

He finished 23rd in voting for the 1960 Most Valuable Player Award for having a 13–8 record in 64 games and  innings, with 10 saves, 14 blown saves, 52 strikeouts and a 2.42 earned run average. The 14 blown saves was a single-season record, matched by only four other pitchers.

In 15 years, he had a 134–111 record in 640 games, 186 games started, 58 complete games, 9 shutouts, 246 games finished, 61 saves,  innings, 2,070 hits allowed, 946 runs allowed (814 earned), 187 home runs allowed, 529 walks (37 intentional), 727 strikeouts, 63 hit batsmen, 27 wild pitches, 8,398 batters faced, 2 balks and a 3.70 earned run average.

He died at his home in Vancouver, Washington, of natural causes at the age of 87.

References

External links

1920 births
2008 deaths
Major League Baseball pitchers
St. Louis Cardinals players
Cincinnati Redlegs players
New York Yankees players
Chicago White Sox players
Kansas City Athletics players
Detroit Tigers players
National League All-Stars
American League All-Stars
Baseball players from Washington (state)
Boise Pilots players
Sacramento Solons players
Columbus Red Birds players
Portland Beavers players
Sportspeople from Vancouver, Washington